Liddel Castle is a ruined castle in Liddesdale, by the Liddel Water, near Castleton in the Scottish Borders area of Scotland, in the former county of Roxburghshire. Liddel Castle is a scheduled monument.

History
A motte and bailey castle was built by Ranulf I de Soules in the 12th century after being granted the Lordship of Liddesdale by David I of Scotland. The castle was constructed on a bluff above the east bank of Liddel Water and protected on two sides by the Kirk Cleuch Burn. Liddel castle probably served as the caput of the barony.

During the Scottish Wars of Independence, Edward I of England visited the castle in 1296 and 1298. The castle appears to have been abandoned by the early 14th century.

See also
Anglo-Scottish border
List of places in the Scottish Borders
List of places in Scotland

Citations

References
 
 Jeffrey, A. (1855–64) The history and antiquities of Roxburghshire and adjacent districts from the most remote period to the present time, 4v, London; Edinburgh, Page(s): Vol.4, 232, Held at RCAHMS D.1.3.JEF.R

External links

RCAHMS record of Liddel Castle
Scottish Borders Council: Heritage Sites Around Newcastleton
Geograph image: Pasture near Liddel Castle

Ruined castles in the Scottish Borders
Scheduled monuments in Scotland
12th-century establishments in Scotland